is a former Japanese football player.

Playing career
Sugano was born in Kanagawa Prefecture on April 5, 1980. After graduating from high school, he joined J1 League club JEF United Ichihara in 1999. On April 12, 2000, he debuted against Oita Trinita in 2000 J.League Cup. However he could only play this match. In May 2000, he moved to J2 League club Ventforet Kofu on loan. He played many matches as forward. In 2001, he returned to JEF United Ichihara. However he could hardly play in the match. In August 2001, he moved to Shonan Bellmare. He played many matches as substitute. In 2002, he moved to Paraguayan club River Plate Asunción. In 2003, the player scores during a promotion play-off against 3 de Febrero on 12 October. The fixture ends 4–2 in favor of 3 de Febrero. He retired end of 2005 season.

Club statistics

References

External links

1980 births
Living people
Association football people from Kanagawa Prefecture
Japanese footballers
J1 League players
J2 League players
JEF United Chiba players
Vissel Kobe players
Shonan Bellmare players
Association football forwards
Japanese expatriate footballers
Japanese expatriate sportspeople in Paraguay
Expatriate footballers in Paraguay